HD 171301 is a suspected binary star system in the northern constellation of Lyra. It has not been well-studied. The brighter member of the pair, designated component A, has a blue-white hue and is visible to the naked eye with an apparent visual magnitude of 5.47. The system is located at a distance of approximately 347 light years from the Sun based on parallax, but is drifting closer with a radial velocity of −10 km/s.

The stellar classification of HD 171301 is B8IV, matching a late B-type star that may be a subgiant that is evolving off the main sequence. HD 171301 appears to be a type of chemically peculiar mercury-manganese star. It has an estimated mass three times that of the Sun and 2.7 times the Sun's radius. The star is spinning with a projected rotational velocity of 36 km/s. It is radiating 124 times the luminosity of the Sun from its photosphere at an effective temperature of 11,695 K.

Its companion, component B, is a 13th magnitude star of an unknown spectral type. It was first reported by S. W. Burnham in 1891.

References

External links
 http://alcyone.de/cgi-bin/search.pl?object=HR6968 

B-type subgiants
Mercury-manganese stars
Double stars

Lyra (constellation)
Durchmusterung objects
171301
6968
090923